The Fangcheng Fellowship (Chinese: 方城团契) is a Christian religious movement in China. Established in the early 1970s by Li Tianen, it expanded to become one of the largest house church networks with, as of 2010, an estimated ten million members. If considered Protestant, it constitutes one of the largest Protestant denominations in the world, and the second largest in China, behind the state-supported Three-Self Patriotic Movement.

See also
List of the largest Protestant bodies

Notes 

Protestantism in China